Thorson or Thorsen are Swedish, Norwegian and Danish surnames which may refer to:

Thorson
Charles Thorson (1890–1966), Canadian political cartoonist, character designer
Celeste Thorson, American actress, model writer, and activist. 
Clayton Thorson (born 1995), American football player
Eric Thorson, American Inspector General for the United States Treasury Department.
Gunnar Thorson (1906-1971), Danish marine zoologist and ecologist.
Herman Thorson (1880–1960) American politician with the North Dakota Republican Party
John F. Thorson (1920–1944) American soldier in the United States Army
Joseph Thorarinn Thorson (1889– 1978),  Canadian lawyer and politician 
Karen L. Thorson, American television producer 
Linda Thorson,  Canadian actress
Mark Thorson, American football player
Scott Thorson, American who became famous for his relationship with Liberace 
Tanner Thorson, American racing driver
Theodore W. Thorson (1922-2018), American educator and politician
Victoria Thorson (born 1943), American sculptor and art historian
William Thorson, Swedish professional poker player

Thorsen
Eric Thorsen, American sculptor
Finn Thorsen, Norwegian footballer
Jan Einar Thorsen, Norwegian Olympic alpine skier
Jens Jørgen Thorsen (1932-2002),  Danish artist 
Kjetil Trædal Thorsen, Norwegian professor
Sven-Ole Thorsen, Danish actor, stuntman, and athlete
Vegard Thorsen, Norwegian heavy metal guitarist

See also
Thorsen House (ca. 1909), in Berkeley, California
Thorson's rule, a rule which states that benthic marine invertebrates produce large numbers of eggs at low latitudes and produce fewer and larger eggs at high latitudes

See also
Thoresen

Norwegian-language surnames